This is a list of scientific journals published in the field of statistics.

Introductory and outreach
The American Statistician
Significance

General theory and methodology

Annals of the Institute of Statistical Mathematics
Annals of Statistics
AStA Wirtschafts- und Sozialstatistisches Archiv
Biometrika

Communications in Statistics
International Statistical Review
Journal of the American Statistical Association

Journal of Multivariate Analysis

Journal of the Royal Statistical Society

Probability and Mathematical Statistics
Sankhyā: The Indian Journal of Statistics
Scandinavian Journal of Statistics

Statistica Sinica
Statistical Science

Stochastic Processes and their Applications

Applications
Annals of Applied Statistics
Journal of Applied Statistics
Journal of the Royal Statistical Society, Series C: Applied Statistics
Journal of Statistical Software

Statistical Modelling
Statistics and its Interface

The R Journal
The Stata Journal

Statistics education
Journal of Statistics Education

Specialized journals in various areas of statistics

Biostatistics
Biometrical Journal
Biometrics
Biometrika
Biostatistics

The International Journal of Biostatistics

Pharmaceutical Statistics
Statistical Applications in Genetics and Molecular Biology
Statistical Methods in Medical Research

Statistics in Medicine (journal)

Computational statistics
Communications in Statistics - Simulation and Computation
Computational Statistics
Computational Statistics & Data Analysis
Journal of Computational and Graphical Statistics

Journal of Statistical Computation and Simulation
Statistics and Computing

Econometrics
Applied Econometrics and International Development
Econometric Reviews
Econometric Theory
Econometrica
Journal of Applied Econometrics
Journal of Business & Economic Statistics
Journal of Econometrics

The Review of Economics and Statistics

Environmental and ecological sciences
Atmospheric Environment

Journal of Agricultural, Biological, and Environmental Statistics

Physical sciences, technology, and quality
Chemometrics and Intelligent Laboratory Systems
Journal of Chemometrics
Journal of Statistical Mechanics: Theory and Experiment
Journal of Statistical Physics
Physica A: Statistical mechanics and its applications
Technometrics

Social sciences

British Journal of Mathematical and Statistical Psychology

Journal of Educational and Behavioral Statistics
Journal of the Royal Statistical Society, Series A: Statistics in Society

Multivariate Behavioral Research
Psychological Methods
Psychometrika
Structural Equation Modeling

Time-series analysis
International Journal of Forecasting
Journal of Time Series Analysis

Open access statistics journals
The following journals are considered open access:

Bayesian Analysis
Brazilian Journal of Probability and Statistics
Chilean Journal of Statistics
Electronic Journal of Statistics
Journal of Official Statistics
Journal of Modern Applied Statistical Methods
Journal of Statistical Software
Journal of Statistics Education
Revista Colombiana de Estadistica −(Colombian Journal of Statistics)
REVSTAT
SORT
Statistics Surveys
Survey Methodology/Techniques d'enquête
Technology Innovations in Statistics Education
The R Journal

See also
 List of scientific journals
 List of probability journals
 List of mathematics journals

References

Statistics
 
Journals